Scopula humifusaria is a moth of the  family Geometridae. It is found in Russia, Turkey, Turkmenistan, Kyrghyzstan and Kazakhstan.

References

Moths described in 1837
humifusaria
Moths of Europe
Moths of Asia